Premasathi Coming Suun (Marathi:प्रेमासाठी Coming सून) is a 2014 Marathi comedy about Aditya (Adinath Kothare), a young man in his early twenties whose family is looking for a bride for him, and Antara (Neha Pendse), the prospective bride with a hidden agenda.

Reception

Premasathi Coming Suun was met with favorable reviews. Bookmyshow.com gave it 2 out of 5 stars, calling it "a neat and clean comedy".

Cast

 Neha Pendse as Antara
 Adinath Kothare as Aditya
 Jitendra Joshi as Kolte Patil
 Resham Tipnis as Antara's Mami
 Vijay Patkar as Antara's Mama
 Suhas Joshi as Aditya's Aaji
 Anchal Poddar

Music

Soundtrack

References

External links
 

2014 films
2010s Marathi-language films